Deri is a village in Caerphilly County Borough, Wales. 'Deri' is Welsh for oak trees. Deri along with Pentwyn and Fochriw make up the community of Darran Valley. The village grew around the Industrial Age to serve the collieries of Fochriw, Pencarreg and Groesfaen.
It was served by Darran and Deri railway station until its closure.

References

Villages in Caerphilly County Borough